Fesenjān (also called fesenjoon in Tehrani dialect) is a sweet and sour Iranian stew (a khoresh) from Northern Iran. It is typically served over rice in the Iranian manner. Like other khoresh stews served over rice, fesenjan is common also to Iraqi cuisine. As a festive dish for special occasions, it has become part of Jewish Rosh Hashannah celebrations. Even though the typology of Jewish ethnic cuisines is imprecise, fesenjan may be considered part of Sephardic cuisine. In Azerbaijan, where it called fisincan plov, the stew is made with lamb meatballs instead of poultry.

About 
Fesenjān is flavored with pomegranate paste and ground walnuts (see bazha) and spices like turmeric, cinnamon, orange peel, cardamom, and rosebud. It is traditionally made with eggplant and poultry (duck or chicken). Fesenjān can also be made using balls of ground meat or chunks of lamb. Depending on the recipe, it can have a sweet or sour taste. Fesenjān is served with Iranian white or yellow rice (polo or chelo). 

If the pomegranate sauce comes out too sour, sugar and fried onions may be added to sweeten it. Sometimes, a hot iron is applied to cause oxidation and darken the sauce's color.

It is a dish that is part of the dinner table on Yaldā Night celebrations.

History 
The earliest known reference to fesenjān is in Mirza Ali-Akbar Khan Ashpazbashi's Sofra-ye at'ema from 1881, which lists ten different varieties of the dish: walnut (today the most common), almond, eggplant, kidney bean, quince, potato, carrot, pumpkin, fish, and yogurt. The first dictionary to mention fesenjān is the Farhang-e Anandraj, which calls it fasūjan and says that the dish originated in Gilan.

Culture 
Fesenjān is an elaborate dish that is often reserved for special occasions. It is considered "a rich man's dish", which is referenced in the Persian expression "he behaves as if he has had partridge and fesenjān", meaning to show off or act pretentiously.

In the traditional Iranian system of garm and sard foods (i.e. "hot" and "cold", respectively), fesenjān is considered "hot" because it uses walnuts, which are also considered a "hot" food. In order to balance out this hotness, sometimes people will add coriander (a "cold" plant) to it; peeled pumpkin is also added for the same reason, as well as to act as a sugar substitute.

See also
 Ghormeh sabzi
 Gheimeh
 Iranian cuisine
 List of stews
 Pomegranate soup

References

External links 
 Khoresh fesenjan recipe

Azerbaijani cuisine
Iranian stews
Afghan cuisine
Iranian cuisine
Rosh Hashanah foods
Sephardi Jewish cuisine
Talysh cuisine
Turkish stews
Poultry dishes
Walnut dishes